Ulysses is a text editor for Apple Mac OS X, iPad, and iPhone.  It is targeted at creative writers who do not want to worry about text layout, formatting, or other distractions, and who want to focus on their words, although it does support Markdown for basic formatting.

History
Ulysses was named after the novel Ulysses by James Joyce.

The Ulysses software was originally released for Mac OS and in version 2.5 support was added for iPhone and iPad.

The license for Ulysses has been a subscription model (SaaS) since version 11.

See also
List of text editors
Comparison of text editors

References

External links
The Ulysses web site

MacOS text editors
MacOS-only software